is a black-and-white 1954 Japanese film directed by Ishirō Honda.

Cast
 Ryō Ikebe
 Rentaro Mikuni
 Akihiko Hirata
 Mariko Okada

References

External links
  http://www.ishirohonda.com/works/195402-saraba/195402-saraba.shtml
  http://www.jmdb.ne.jp/1954/cd000430.htm
 

1954 films
Japanese black-and-white films
Films directed by Ishirō Honda
Films produced by Tomoyuki Tanaka
Toho films
Japanese war films
1954 war films
1950s Japanese films